Christopher Raeburn (born 13 August 1982) is a British fashion designer, known for reworking surplus fabrics and garments to create menswear, womenswear and accessories.

Early life 
Christopher Raeburn was born the youngest of three boys in Kent. He spent a lot of time in the outdoors in his childhood, using his imagination and inventing. "We were encouraged to draw something in the week and then challenged to make it with my dad on the weekend. From the age of 11, I was in air cadets, I learnt to fly. I was doing my Duke of Edinburgh. I was doing walks in Holland. I had this love of being prepared".

Career 

Raeburn graduated from London's Royal College of Art in 2006. He freelanced as a pattern cutter before setting up his own studio in 2008, and later his label. Raeburn participated in the 'Camouflage' exhibition at London's Imperial War Museum and featured in Hywel Davies' publication '100 New Designers'. He ended 2008 with his first collection showcased during London Design Week, a capsule range of reversible garments titled Inverted.

In 2009, Raeburn showcased menswear in Paris, received an award from the International Ethical Fashion Forum, and gained support from Esthetica, allowing him to show his work at London Fashion Week that September. In 2010, Raeburn was the first designer to be awarded Topshop NEWGEN sponsorship for both men's and women's wear in the same season.

Raeburn has become known for the ethical integrity of his work, although he admits it was never his intention. American Vogue's August 2010 issue highlighted Raeburn's contribution to all things green with the advice to "Remember the four R's – Reduce, Reuse, Recycle and Raeburn", accompanied by a Mario Testino shoot of Blake Lively wearing a Raeburn Duffle Coat. After viewing his Autumn/Winter 2011 London Fashion Week presentation at the disused Aldwych tube station, Style.com stated, "it's not unreasonable to assert that Christopher Raeburn is the single most radical designer working today".

In 2010, Raeburn was approached by Victorinox to collaborate with them on a men's and women's wear capsule collection. Victorinox set up a "Remade in Switzerland" studio in Ibach, the birthplace of Karl Elsener, the founder of Victorinox. He found the original house where Elsener founded the brand as inspiration for the establishment of his Swiss LAB. In his lab, he produced 100 pieces of each style by hand. The collaboration launched on schedule during New York Fashion Week in February 2011.

In 2011, he was nominated for the 'Observer Ethical Awards: Fashion Category' and 'Condé Nast Traveller award: design and innovation' prizes, and his 'REMADE IN SWITZERLAND' collaboration with Victorinox is shown on schedule at NYFW.

In 2012, the brand started to widen its stockist list, counting more than 20 stores worldwide, including the Paris-based boutique Colette. In that year Christopher Raeburn also launched his first accessories collection, as well as the much-awaited first collaboration with Moncler.

The following year, Raeburn's visibility continued to increase, with the designer receiving sponsorship from Woolmark for his SS14 season. 2013 was a big year for Christopher Raeburn, who in that year not only won Designer Business of the Year at the UK Fashion and Textiles awards but also launched two major collaborations, with Rapha and Fred Perry. He ended the year by being announced as artistic director of Victorinox Fashion, due to past collaborations.

In 2014, there were two Woolmark sponsorships for Raeburn, this time towards his AW14 and his SS15 seasons, menswear and womenswear. The designer was, once again, shortlisted for BFC/GQ Designer Menswear Fund, and also launched his Barbour collaboration. In the same year, Christopher Raeburn won Menswear Brand of the Year at the UK Fashion and Textiles Awards.

In 2015, Raeburn was shortlisted for the second year for BFC/GQ Designer Menswear Fund  and he was sponsored again by Woolmark for his AW15 collection. He launched two collaborations: one with Wool and The Gang, to create a joint line of knitted accessories, and one with knitwear specialised brand Unmade, to create an interactive bespoke knitwear. In the same year Raeburn received the award for Best Emerging Designer  at the GQ Men of the Year Awards, and later on he launched his first footwear menswear and womenswear joint collections with Clarks.

At the beginning of 2016, Raeburn saw his "Layers of Natural Innovation" partnership with The Woolmark company shown at the ICA during London Fashion Week in celebration of the versatility of Merino Wool, before being shortlisted for a third year for the BFC / GQ Designer Menswear Fashion Fund. That year Raeburn also launched a collaboration with MCM.

In Autumn 2018, US lifestyle brand Timberland announced its appointment of Christopher Raeburn as global creative director of the brand. This was followed by the news that Raeburn would revive Left Hand and ST95, brands developed by Stone Island-founder Massimo Osti, in December 2020.

In November 2021, RÆBURN created a partnership with circular fashion platform Responsible.us and Christopher was appointed as an Advisory Board Member, supporting the reCommerce platform in broadening its credibility and reach within the circularity category. In April 2022, Christopher revised his relationship with Timberland, continuing his commitment to eco-innovation and style in a new role as a collaborator at large, where he’ll continue to lead creative for the Earthkeepers platform, as well as assist with a roster of collaborators for Timberland. In the summer of 2022, RÆBURN was selected as a finalist for the Zalando Sustainability Award, which saw Christopher present the brand's SS23 collection at Copenhagen Fashion Week.  ⁠

Awards 
 2010: NewGen sponsorship for both menswear and womenswear
 2010 and 2011: Rising Star at the UK Fashion and Textiles Awards
 2011: British Fashion Award for Emerging Talent Menswear
 2013: Designer of the Year at the UKFT Awards
 2014: Menswear Brand of the Year at the UKFT Awards
 2015: Best Emerging Designer at the GQ Men of the Year Awards
2019: Honorary professorship and Lifetime Achievement Award by the Glasgow Caledonian University (GCU)
2020: Brand of the Year (RÆBURN) at the Drapers Sustainable Fashion Awards
2020: Fashion Award 2020 (RÆBURN), selected as one of the Honourees of the Environment category
2021: Brand of the Year (RÆBURN) at the Drapers Sustainable Fashion Awards
 2022: One of the Winners of the Common Objective Leadership Award (RÆBURN) 
2022: Brand of the Year (RÆBURN) at the Drapers Sustainable Fashion Awards
 2022: Most Sustainable Store Design (RÆBURN’s Marshall Street, Carnaby Store) in the Drapers Sustainable Fashion Awards
 2022: Zalando Sustainability Award Finalist

Collaborations 

The Lab E20 opened in July; a 3,500sq ft space produced and designed by Raeburn. It will form Get Living’s new creative hub in East Village, London.

References

External links
 

English fashion designers
1982 births
Living people